Sobera is a surname. Notable people with the surname include:

 Carlos Sobera (born 1960), Spanish actor
 Jerzy Sobera (born 1970), Polish ice hockey player
 Robert Sobera (born 1991), Polish pole vaulter

See also
 

Polish-language surnames